Scaeosopha chionoscia is a species of moth of the family Cosmopterigidae. It is found in Brunei and on Java.

The wingspan is 14–17 mm.

The larvae have been reared on the fruits of Nauclea orientalis.

References

Moths described in 1933
Scaeosophinae